Future of the Past is a compilation album by the Polish death metal band Vader. It was released in 1996 by System Shock/Impact Records in Europe, and in Poland by Koch International. The CD consists entirely of covers by various bands.

Future of the Past was recorded between March and September 1996 at Selani Studio in Olsztyn in Poland produced by Vader. The album was mastered by Grzegorz Piwkowski at Modern Sound Studio in Gdynia in Poland. Piotr "Peter" Wiwczarek commented on Chronicles of Chaos magazine about recording album:

Track listing

Personnel
Production and performance credits are adapted from the album liner notes.

Release history

References

Vader (band) albums
1996 albums